A zebra crossing (British English) or a marked crosswalk (American English) is a pedestrian crossing marked with white stripes (zebra markings). Normally, pedestrians are afforded precedence over vehicular traffic, although the significance of the markings may vary by jurisdiction. They are known as "zebra" crossings as the stripes resemble the coat of a zebra.

The first zebra crossing was installed in Slough, United Kingdom in 1951 to enhance pedestrian safety at new and already existing crossing points. Since then, zebra markings have been used at crossing points internationally to denote pedestrian crossings. Many have been replaced by various types of signalled crossing due to safety concerns.

Terminology and usage of the markings varies by country. In the UK and other Commonwealth countries, they are usually called zebra crossings, as the stripes resemble the striped coat of a zebra. In the UK, zebra markings are only found at unsignalised, standalone zebra crossings and must be accompanied with upright belisha beacons. In the US, they can be found at any type of crossing.

History

Etymology 
The origin of the zebra title is debated. It is generally attributed to British MP James Callaghan who, in 1948, visited the country's Transport and Road Research Laboratory which was working on a new idea for safe pedestrian crossings. On being shown a black and white design, Callaghan is said to have remarked that it resembled a zebra. Callaghan did not himself claim authorship of the term.

Introduction 
The first zebra crossing was introduced on Slough High Street in the United Kingdom on 31 October 1951. Pedestrian crossings with Belisha beacons had been in use in the UK since the 1930s, originally introduced under Section 18 of the Road Traffic Act, 1934. The Belisha beacon is an upright crossing marking, still required by zebra and parallel crossings in the UK, named after the Minister of Transport in 1934, Leslie Hore-Belisha.

However, with an increase of car traffic, the effectiveness of the beacons was waning; both pedestrians and drivers were ignoring the crossing. From 1949 to 1951, the then-named Ministry of Transport experimented with designs to improve visibility and increase usage, until the familiar black and white stripes were introduced. The zebra crossing was then trialed at 1,000 experimental sites across the UK at this time. The zebra markings are credited to physicist and traffic engineer George Charlesworth, who was the first head of the traffic section at the Road Research Laboratory.

Characteristics 
The crossing is characterised by longitudinal stripes on the road, parallel to the flow of the traffic, alternately a light colour and a dark one. The similarity of these markings to those of a zebra gave rise to the crossing's name. The light colour is usually white and the dark colour may be painted – in which case black is typical – or left unpainted if the road surface itself is dark.

Sometimes, zebra crossings are placed on a speed bump, meaning the zebra crossing is level with the pavement. This is done to make it safer for pedestrians to cross, since drivers need to slow down to go over the speed bump. However, this is more expensive than a traditional zebra crossing, and can impede the flow of traffic and response times for emergency vehicles, especially on roads with higher speed limits.

In the United Kingdom, the crossing is marked with Belisha beacons, which are flashing amber globes on black and white posts on each side of the road, named after Leslie Hore-Belisha, the Minister of Transport, who introduced them in 1934. Pedestrians have priority when they step onto the crossing: The Highway Code states that road traffic "MUST give way when a pedestrian has moved onto a crossing."

In other countries, such as the United States, zebra crossings are also used on pedestrian crossings controlled by traffic signals.

Method of marking 

The lines of a zebra crossing are commonly laid down by a road marking machine.  Because the width of crossing lines is wider than other traffic lines, the marking shoe of a zebra cross marking machine is accordingly wider.  The machine is hand pushed.

Zebra crossings by country

United Kingdom 

In the United Kingdom, it is the law that all road users, including motorists, give way to pedestrians who have set foot on a zebra crossing. A fine of £100 and three licence penalty points is given to those failing to give way at the crossings. This penalty has attracted criticisms of leniency when compared to other countries which enforce fines of up to £2,000. For failing to give way at a zebra crossing patrolled by a school crossing patrol ("lollipop man/lady" as they are commonly called), however, the penalty rises to £1,000 and a minimum of three licence points, with the possibility even of disqualification. In the United Kingdom, motorists have to stop for a crossing patrol, even when it is not on a pedestrian crossing.

In the United Kingdom, lollipop men or women (school crossing patrols) frequently attend zebra crossings near schools, at the hours when schoolchildren arrive and leave. Their widely used nickname arose because of the warning sign they hold up as they stop traffic:  the sign is a large round disc on a long pole and thus resembles a giant lollipop, although they were originally of a square design.

Continental Europe & the Middle East 
In Germany, Scandinavia, and most other European countries, pedestrians have right of way if they are still on the kerb but about to enter the crossing.

In Switzerland yellow stripes are used for pedestrian crossings. Unlike a yellow tiger crossing in the UK, however, cyclists are required to dismount to cross.

In Lebanon, striped crossings are the preferred pedestrian crossing type, though many other variations exist. Zebra crossings are painted mostly at signalised intersections and roundabouts. They are also widely used in school areas and stop sign regulated intersections. They provide priority and right of way to pedestrians under all circumstances.

North America 
In North America, pedestrian crossings are almost exclusively called crosswalks, but depending on the marking style, they can have different names.
Although zebra crossings exist in the US, the term is used to describe a type of diagonal crosswalk with two parallel lines painted over the stripes, similar but not identical to the ladder style. Instead, zebra crossings are called "continental crosswalks" and are the preferred style in many states because of its enhanced visibility compared to the other marking styles. In most areas of Canada, standard parallel lines markings are the preferred crosswalk style, except in Toronto where zebra markings are widely used.

Oceania 
In New Zealand, motorists are required to give way to pedestrians. Pedestrians wishing to cross the road within  of a crossing facility (which includes zebra crossings) must use a crossing facility.

In Australia, raised zebra crossings are sometimes called wombat crossings.

Compliance
A 1998 Swedish study by A Várhelyi at Lund University found that the frequency of giving way at zebra crossings was 5% and drivers typically did not observe the law concerning speed behaviour at the zebra crossing. Speed behaviour in encounters (148 observations), non-encounters with pedestrian presence (642 observations) and situations without pedestrian presence (690 observations) were compared.

Three out of four drivers maintained the same speed or accelerated and only one out of four slowed down or braked. The study concluded that encounters between cars and pedestrians at the zebra crossing were critical situations in which the driver had to be influenced before he reached the decision zone at  before the zebra crossing, in order to prevent "signalling by speed" behaviour.

Alternative designs

Cow crossing
The city of A Coruña in Galicia, Spain, has opted for spots rather than stripes at a pedestrian crossing, resembling a cow instead of a zebra. The reason for this option is to recognise the importance of the animal for the region's farming.

Tiger and parallel crossings

A tiger crossing is a variation used in Hong Kong and the United Kingdom. It is painted yellow and black. In the United Kingdom, it allows cyclists to cross in a central area of the road without dismounting, and obliges motorists to give way to both cyclists and pedestrians. Aylesbury, Buckinghamshire experimented with tiger crossings during 2006–2007, but replaced them with toucan crossings. A tiger crossing was introduced in Portsmouth in 2019.

"Three-dimensional" crossings 
A number of countries have experimented with "three-dimensional" zebra crossings based on an optical illusion. The white stripes of the crossing appear to hover above the ground as though they were a physical barrier. Although intended to improve pedestrian safety on the crossings, they have also been popular with tourists who like to be photographed crossing them, appearing to hover above the ground. Such crossings can be found in Australia, Iceland, Malaysia, India, New Zealand and the United States.

Crossings can be combined with speed tables (i.e. raised sections of road designed to physically slow traffic down) as an additional safety measure.

Rainbow crossings
A zebra crossing immediately outside the Russian Embassy in Helsinki was painted in summer 2013 with the colours of the rainbow to protest the Russian government's policy towards lesbian and gay people, the rainbow being one symbol of the LGBT culture.

A similar protest has also been made on a zebra crossing near the Russian Embassy in Stockholm, Sweden.

In 2018 in Paris, the authorities decided to paint some crossings with rainbow borders for the Pride; those were supposed to be temporary, but after homophobic vandalism, the municipality declared that the rainbow stripes would remain permanently.

In popular culture
A zebra crossing appears on the cover of The Beatles' Abbey Road album. The cover made the crossing a tourist attraction, and it has been incorporated into the Abbey Road Studios logo. Since the Abbey Road photo was taken, zigzag lines at the kerb and in the centre of the road have been added to all zebra crossings. English Heritage has given this crossing Grade II listed building status.

There is also a tongue-in-cheek reference to zebra crossings in the science-fiction comedy The Hitchhiker's Guide to the Galaxy by English author Douglas Adams, in reference to Man using the improbable creature called the Babel fish as proof of the non-existence of God; the novel says, "Man then goes on to prove that black is white and gets himself killed at the next zebra crossing."

The La Paz traffic zebras is a team of young people who dress in zebra costumes and dance in the streets of La Paz, Bolivia, in order to make drivers and pedestrians aware of traffic rules.

Gallery

References

Notes

Sources

 History of Road Safety, Gerald Cummins
 The History of British Roadsigns

Pedestrian crossings
Road surface markings

de:Fußgängerüberweg
it:Attraversamento pedonale
no:Fotgjengerovergang
pt:Faixa de Segurança